Jason Adams may refer to:

Jason Leland Adams (born 1963), American actor and theater director 
Jason William Adams (born 1983), American stage and voice-over actor
Jason Adams, American guitarist for the band Lustra
Jason Adams (EastEnders), a character in a British soap opera